Toilet Böys is the first recorded output by notorious NYC punk/glam band, the Toilet Böys. This album was recorded without eventual lead guitarist and band staple, Sean Pierce.

Track listing
 Phly
 Paul Stanley (Was A Lady)
 Stalker
 Squeeze Box Baby
 Scaredy Cat
 Good Girl

Toilet Böys albums
1996 EPs